Sviatoshynsky Forest Park is a forest park located in the region of Kyiv Polissya on the sandy terrace of the Irpin River in Ukraine. It has the status of a park-monument of landscape art.

References

Parks in Ukraine